In Greek mythology, Cleon (/ˈkliːɒn, -ən/; Ancient Greek: Κλέων Kleon) was a fisherman from Syme, a small island between Caria and Rhodes. He came with their king Nireus to fight against Troy.

Mythology 
Cleon was slain by Polydamas, the Trojan friend of the hero Hector.
Polydamas struck down Eurymachus and Cleon with his spear. From Syme came with Nireus' following these: cunning were both in craft of fisher-folk to east the hook baited with guile, to drop into the sea the net, from the boat's prow with deftest hands swiftly and straight to plunge the three-forked spear. But not from bane their sea-craft saved them now.

Notes

References 

 Quintus Smyrnaeus, The Fall of Troy translated by Way. A. S. Loeb Classical Library Volume 19. London: William Heinemann, 1913. Online version at theio.com
 Quintus Smyrnaeus, The Fall of Troy. Arthur S. Way. London: William Heinemann; New York: G.P. Putnam's Sons. 1913. Greek text available at the Perseus Digital Library.

Achaeans (Homer)